Camil is an Arabic (meaning perfect, accomplished or complete in Arabic), Romanian and French male given name. In French it is much more often spelled Camille. The source of the name is the Latin Camillus. In Arabic Camil can be spelled Camil, Kamil, Kamel, Camel, Kamal or Camal .

People named Camil:
Camil Baltazar (1902–1977)
Camil Bouchard (born 1945)
Camil Mureșanu (1927–2015)
Camil Petrescu (1894–1957)
Camil Ressu (1880–1962)
Camil Samson (1935–2012)

Romanian masculine given names